Sarcopenia is a type of muscle loss (muscle atrophy) that occurs with aging and/or immobility.  It is characterized by the degenerative loss of skeletal muscle mass, quality, and strength. The rate of muscle loss is dependent on exercise level, co-morbidities, nutrition and other factors. The muscle loss is related to changes in muscle synthesis signalling pathways. It is distinct from cachexia, in which muscle is degraded through cytokine-mediated degradation, although both conditions may co-exist. Sarcopenia is considered a component of frailty syndrome. Sarcopenia can lead to reduced quality of life, falls, fracture, and disability.

Sarcopenia is a factor in changing body composition associated with aging populations; and certain muscle regions are expected to be affected first, specifically the anterior thigh and abdominal muscles. In population studies, body mass index (BMI) is seen to decrease in aging populations while bioelectrical impedance analysis (BIA) shows body fat proportion rising.

The term sarcopenia is from Greek σάρξ sarx, "flesh" and πενία penia, "poverty". This was first proposed by Rosenberg in 1989, who wrote that "there may be no single feature of age-related decline that could more dramatically affect ambulation, mobility, calorie intake, and overall nutrient intake and status, independence, breathing, etc."

Signs and symptoms
The hallmark sign of sarcopenia is loss of lean muscle mass, or muscle atrophy. The change in body composition may be difficult to detect due to obesity, changes in fat mass, or edema. Changes in weight, limb or waist circumference are not reliable indicators of muscle mass changes. Sarcopenia may also cause reduced strength, functional decline and increased risk of falling. Sarcopenia may also have no symptoms until it is severe and is often unrecognized. Research has shown, however, that hypertrophy may occur in the upper parts of the body to compensate for this loss of lean muscle mass Therefore, one early indicator of the onset of sarcopenia can be significant loss of muscle mass in the anterior thigh and abdominal muscles.

Causes 
There are many proposed causes of sarcopenia and it is likely the result of multiple interacting factors. Understanding of the causes of sarcopenia is incomplete, however changes in hormones, immobility, age-related muscle changes, nutrition and neurodegenerative changes have all been recognized as potential causative factors.

The degree of sarcopenia is determined by two factors: initial amount of muscle mass and rate at which muscle mass declines. Due to variations in these factors across the population, the rate of progression and the threshold at which muscle loss becomes apparent is variable. Immobility dramatically increases the rate of muscle loss, even in younger people. Other factors that can increase rate of progression of sarcopenia include decreased nutrient intake, low physical activity, or chronic disease. Additionally, epidemiological research has indicated that early environmental influences may have long-term effects on muscle health. For example, low birth weight, a marker of a poor early environment, is associated with reduced muscle mass and strength in adult life.

Pathophysiology
There are multiple theories proposed to explain the mechanisms of muscle changes of sarcopenia including changes in satellite cell recruitment, changes in anabolic signalling, protein oxidation, inflammation, and developmental factors. The pathologic changes of sarcopenia include a reduction in muscle tissue quality as reflected in the replacement of muscle fibers with fat, an increase in fibrosis, changes in muscle metabolism, oxidative stress, and degeneration of the neuromuscular junction.

The distribution of muscle fibers types also changes in sarcopenic muscle causing a decrease in type II muscle fibers, or "fast twitch," with little to no decrease in type I muscle fibers, or "slow-twitch" muscle fibers. Deinervated type II fibers are often converted to type I fibers by reinnervation by slow type I fiber motor nerves.

The failure to activate satellite cells upon injury or exercise is also thought to contribute to the pathophysiology of sarcopenia. Additionally, oxidized proteins can lead to a buildup of lipofuscin and cross-linked proteins causing an accumulation of non-contractile material in the skeletal muscle and contribute to sarcopenic muscle.

An apparent protective factor is sufficient levels of the protein BNIP3, which prevents cells' buildup of damaged mitochondria. Deficiency of BNIP3 leads to muscle inflammation and atrophy.

Diagnosis
Multiple diagnostic criteria have been proposed by various expert groups and continues to be an area of research and debate. Despite the lack of a widely accepted definition, sarcopenia was assigned an ICD-10 code (M62.84) in 2016, recognizing it as a disease state.

Sarcopenia can be diagnosed when a patient has muscle mass that is at least two standard deviations below the relevant population mean and has a slow walking speed. The European Working Group on Sarcopenia in Older People (EWGSOP) developed a broad clinical definition for sarcopenia, designated as the presence of low muscle mass and either low muscular strength or low physical performance. Other international groups have proposed criteria that include metrics on walking speed, distance walked in 6 minutes, or grip strength. Hand grip strength alone has also been advocated as a clinical marker of sarcopenia that is simple and cost effective and has good predictive power, although it does not provide comprehensive information.

There are screening tools for sarcopenia that assess patient reported difficulty in doing daily activities such as walking, climbing stairs or standing from a chair and have been shown to predict sarcopenia and poor functional outcomes.

Management

Exercise
Exercise remains the intervention of choice for sarcopenia, but translation of research findings into clinical practice is challenging. The type, duration and intensity of exercise are variable between studies, preventing a standardized exercise prescription for sarcopenia. Lack of exercise is a significant risk factor for sarcopenia and exercise can dramatically slow the rate of muscle loss. Exercise can be an effective intervention because aging skeletal muscle retains ability to synthesize proteins in response to short-term resistance exercise. Progressive resistance training in older adults can improve physical performance (gait speed) and muscular strength.

Medication
There are currently no approved medications for the treatment of sarcopenia. Testosterone or other anabolic steroids have also been investigated for treatment of sarcopenia, and seem to have some positive effects on muscle strength and mass, but cause several side effects and raise concerns of prostate cancer in men and virilization in women. Additionally, recent studies suggest testosterone treatments may induce adverse cardiovascular events.

DHEA and human growth hormone have been shown to have little to no effect in this setting. Growth hormone increases muscle protein synthesis and increases muscle mass, but does not lead to gains in strength and function in most studies. This, and the similar lack of efficacy of its effector insulin-like growth factor 1 (IGF-1), may be due to local resistance to IGF-1 in aging muscle, resulting from inflammation and other age changes.

Other medications under investigation as possible treatments for sarcopenia include ghrelin, vitamin D, angiotensin converting enzyme inhibitors, and eicosapentaenoic acid.

Nutrition
Intake of calories and protein are important stimuli for muscle protein synthesis. Older adults may not utilize protein so efficiently as younger people and may require higher amounts to prevent muscle atrophy. A number of expert groups have proposed an increase in dietary protein recommendations for older age groups to 1.0-1.2 g/kg body weight per day.
Ensuring adequate nutrition in older adults is of interest in the prevention of sarcopenia and frailty, since it is a simple, low-cost treatment approach without major side effects.

Supplements
A component of sarcopenia is the loss of ability for aging skeletal muscle to respond to anabolic stimuli such as amino acids, especially at lower concentrations. However, aging muscle retains the ability of an anabolic response to protein or amino acids at larger doses. Supplementation with larger doses of amino acids, particularly leucine has been reported to counteract muscle loss with aging. Exercise may work synergistically with amino acid supplementation.

β-hydroxy β-methylbutyrate (HMB) is a metabolite of leucine that acts as a signalling molecule to stimulate protein synthesis. It is reported to have multiple targets, including stimulating mTOR and decreasing proteasome expression. Its use to prevent the loss of lean body mass in older adults is consistently supported in clinical trials. More research is needed to determine the precise effects of HMB on muscle strength and function in this age group.

Epidemiology 
The prevalence of sarcopenia depends on the definition used in each epidemiological study. Estimated prevalence in people between the ages of 60-70 is 5-13% and increases to 11-50% in people more than 80 years of age. This equates to >50 million people and is projected to affect >200 million in the next 40 years given the rising population of older adults.

Public health impact
Sarcopenia is emerging as a major public health concern given the increased longevity of industrialized populations and growing geriatric population. Sarcopenia is a predictor of many adverse outcomes including increased disability, falls and mortality. Immobility or bed rest in populations predisposed to sarcopenia can cause dramatic impact on functional outcomes. In the elderly, this often leads to decreased biological reserve and increased vulnerability to stressors known as the "frailty syndrome". Loss of lean body mass is also associated with increased risk of infection, decreased immunity, and poor wound healing. The weakness that accompanies muscle atrophy leads to higher risk of falls, fractures, physical disability, need for institutional care, reduced quality of life, increased mortality, and increased healthcare costs. This represents a significant personal and societal burden and its public health impact is increasingly recognized.

Research directions 
There are significant opportunities to better understand the causes and consequences of sarcopenia and help guide clinical care. This includes elucidation of the molecular and cellular mechanisms of sarcopenia, further refinement of reference populations by ethnic groups, validation of diagnostic criteria and clinical tools, as well as tracking of incidence of hospitalization admissions, morbidity, and mortality. Identification and research on potential therapeutic approaches and timing of interventions is also needed.

New pharmaceutical therapies in clinical development include myostatin and the selective androgen receptor modulators (SARMs). Nonsteriodal SARMs are of particular interest, given they exhibit significant selectivity between the anabolic effects of testosterone on muscle, but with little to no evidence of androgenic effects (such as prostate stimulation in men).

See also 
 Cachexia
 Ageing
 Frailty syndrome
 Geriatrics
 Dynapenia

References

Further reading 
 
 
 Sharlo K, Tyganov SA, Tomilovskaya E, Popov DV, Saveko AA, Shenkman BS. (December 2021) "Effects of Various Muscle Disuse States and Countermeasures on Muscle Molecular Signaling". International Journal of Molecular Sciences. 23(1):468.

External links 

Aging-associated diseases
Geriatrics
Rehabilitation medicine
Senescence